Tate is a group of public art galleries in the United Kingdom.

Tate may additionally refer to:

Arts and entertainment 
 Tate (TV series), an NBC western series 
 Dede and Fred Tate, mother and son characters in Little Man Tate, a 1991 movie 
 Tinnie Tate and other family members, characters in the Garrett P.I. fantasy novels 
 The Airborne Toxic Event, an American rock band

Places 
 Tate, Georgia, United States, an unincorporated community
 Tate County, Mississippi, United States
 Tate Township, Saline County, Illinois, United States
 Tate Township, Clermont County, Ohio, United States
 Tate, Saskatchewan, Canada, an unincorporated community
 Táté, the Hungarian name for Totoi village, Sântimbru Commune, Alba County, Romania
 Tate District, Ica Province, Peru
 Mount Tate, Toyama Prefecture, Japan
 Mount Tate (New South Wales), Australia
 Tate River, Queensland, Australia
 Tate Island, in Saskatchewan Canada
 Tate Glacier, Ross Dependency, Antarctica
 Tate Rocks, Princess Elizabeth Land, Antarctica
 Tate, a term denoting a land division, equivalent in parts of Ireland to the modern term townland

Businesses 
 Tate Interactive, a video game developer
 Tate Publishing (disambiguation), one of several book publishers with the same name

People 
 Tate (surname), a list of people with the surname
 Tate (given name), a list of people with the given name or nickname
 Æthelburh of Kent (605–c. 647), also known as Tate, Queen of Northumbria and Abbess of Lyminge
 Tate, codename of Wulf Schmidt (1911–1992), a double agent working for the British during the Second World War

Other uses 
 Tate (spirit), a wind spirit in Lakota mythology
 Tate baronets, a title in the Baronetage of the United Kingdom
 , Japanese stage combat appears on most of jidaigekis, in which Japanese katana swords are usually used
 USS Tate (AKA-70), a World War II attack cargo ship
 Tate Rink, a hockey rink in West Point, New York, United States
 Tate, a variety of the Bine language of Papua New Guinea
 J. M. Tate High School, Cantonment, Florida, United States
 Tate and Liza, characters from the Pokémon franchise

See also
 Tate's Cairn, a mountain in Hong Kong
 Tate Formation, a geologic formation in Kentucky, United States